Football Club MK Étanchéité is a football club from DR Congo founded in 1995 in Kinshasa.

Honours
Coupe du Congo
 Winners (2): 2013, 2014

Performance in CAF competitions
CAF Confederation Cup: 2 appearances
2014 – First Round
2015 – First Round of 16

Notables players 
 Chancel Mbemba
 Junior Kabananga
 Patrick Etshimi

References

External links
Team profile  – The Biggest Football Archive of the World

Football clubs in the Democratic Republic of the Congo
Football clubs in Kinshasa
Association football clubs established in 1995
1995 establishments in Zaire